Parmelia saxatilis, commonly known as the salted shield lichen or crottle, is a species of foliose lichen in the family Parmeliaceae. Several morphologically similar species, formerly lumped together, are now distinguished by their DNA.

Taxonomy

It was first described in 1753 by Carl Linnaeus with the name Lichen saxatilis. Erik Acharius transferred it to Parmelia in 1803.

Molecular phylogenetic studies have shown that Parmelia saxatilis is a member of a species complex–a group of morphologically similar but genetically distinct species. P. discordans, P. ernstiae, P. hygrophila, P. imbricaria, P. mayi, P. omphalodes, P. pinnatifida, P. serrana, P. submontana, P. sulymae, and P. rojoi are other members of this complex. In the case of the European members of this complex, there is no reliable set of morphological and chemical characteristics that can be used to distinguish between these species, and therefore DNA analysis is the only reliable way to identify them.  This has been demonstrated in studies conducted in Scotland and Italy.

Description
The lichen has a greenish-gray to bluish-gray thallus that can turn brown in exposed locations. It typically grows on rock, although it is sometimes found on bark or wood. Parmelia saxatilis is used to make dyes with deep red-brown and rusty-orange colors. Known as "crotal" in Scotland, it was used to dye traditional cloths including Harris tweed. A somewhat similar species complex with a cosmopolitan distribution is the Parmelia sulcata group, generally growing on trees.

Conservation
In 2021, Parmelia saxatilis was assessed for the global IUCN Red List. Because the lichen is common, abundant, and widely distributed with a stable population size, it is considered of least concern.

References

saxatilis
Lichen species
Lichens described in 1753
Lichens of Europe
Lichens of North America
Taxa named by Carl Linnaeus